Taylor House, also known as Meadowview Farm and Taylor-Parke House, is a historic home located in East Bradford Township, Chester County, Pennsylvania. It was built in 1768, and has three sections.  The main section is  stories and constructed of fieldstone. It is four bays wide and has a gable roof. It has a -story stone kitchen wing and an attached stone shed.

It was added to the National Register of Historic Places in 1979. It is also a contributing building to the Taylor-Cope Historic District.

References

External links

 Taylor-Parke House, State Route 162 (East Bradford Township), Copesville, Chester County, PA: 10 photos and 1 photo caption page at Historic American Buildings Survey

Houses on the National Register of Historic Places in Pennsylvania
Houses completed in 1768
Houses in Chester County, Pennsylvania
National Register of Historic Places in Chester County, Pennsylvania
1768 establishments in Pennsylvania